Loutraki-Perachora-Agioi Theodoroi is a municipality in the Corinthia regional unit, Peloponnese, Greece. The seat of the municipality is the town Loutraki. The municipality has an area of 294.90 km2.

The municipality was formed at the 2011 local government reform by the merger of the former municipalities Agioi Theodoroi and Loutraki-Perachora, that became municipal units. Initially named Loutraki-Agioi Theodoroi, in January 2014 the municipality was renamed Loutraki-Perachora-Agioi Theodoroi.

References

 
Municipalities of Peloponnese (region)
Populated places in Corinthia